Baryczka refers to the following places in Poland:

 Baryczka, Masovian Voivodeship
 Baryczka, Podkarpackie Voivodeship